Rosenbach (official name: Rosenbach/Vogtl.) is a municipality in the Vogtlandkreis district, in Saxony, Germany. It was formed on 1 January 2011 by the merger of the former municipalities Leubnitz, Mehltheuer and Syrau.

References 

Municipalities in Saxony
Vogtlandkreis